Jordan Lake, Nova Scotia  is a lake that is located mostly in Shelburne District, in Nova Scotia, Canada. Its northeastern portion crosses into Region of Queens Municipality. The lake lies southwest of the much larger Lake Rossignol.

See also
List of lakes in Nova Scotia

References
 National Resources Canada

Lakes of Nova Scotia
Landforms of Queens County, Nova Scotia
Landforms of Shelburne County, Nova Scotia